Adolfo García-Sastre,(born in Burgos, 10 October 1964) is a Spanish professor of Medicine and Microbiology and co-director of the Global Health & Emerging Pathogens Institute at the Icahn School of Medicine at Mount Sinai in New York City. His research into the biology of influenza viruses has been at the forefront of medical advances in epidemiology.

García-Sastre is the author of more than 200 publications.

Biography
Born in Burgos, Spain, García-Sastre earned his PhD at the University of Salamanca. His research interest has been focused on the molecular biology of influenza viruses and several other negative-strand RNA viruses. His contributions to his field have included the generation and evaluation of influenza virus vectors as potential vaccine candidates against infectious diseases, including malaria and AIDS, as well as the development (with Peter Palese) of the first reverse-genetic approaches for the production of infectious recombinant influenza viruses from plasmid DNA – research which has resulted in techniques which are now routinely used with many negative strand RNA viruses. He was the first to identify the biological role of the non-structural NS1 Influenza Protein during infection, the first to describe and provide a molecular analysis of a viral-encoded IFN antagonist among negative strand RNA viruses, and the first to demonstrate that the M1 protein of the influenza virus determines its morphology.

In 2005, as principal investigator of an NIAID program project grant, García-Sastre and his team made headlines when they reconstructed the extinct 1918 pandemic influenza virus.

García-Sastre is an editor for the Journal of Experimental Medicine and PLOS Pathogens, and he sits on the editorial boards of the Journal of Virology, Virology, Virus Research and the Journal of General Virology. In 2001, he co-organized the International Course on Viral Vectors in Heidelberg, Germany, which was sponsored by the Federation of European Biochemical Societies (FEBS), as well as the first Research Conference on Orthomyxoviruses, also in 2001, which was held in the Netherlands and sponsored by the European Scientific Working Group on Influenza. He is a co-founder of Vivaldi Biosciences and a member of the company's Scientific Advisory board and is the leader of the basic research component on the NIAID-funded Viral Therapeutics and Pathogenesis of the North East Biodefense Center proposal. He was among the first members of the Vaccine Study Section of the National Institutes of Health. He is also principal investigator for the Center for Research on Influenza Pathogenesis, one of five NIAID Centers of Excellence for Influenza Research and Surveillance (CEIRS).

He was elected to the National Academy of Sciences in 2019.

Patents
García-Sastre holds 7 patents:

Publications
Partial List:

References

External links
Icahn School of Medicine at Mount Sinai homepage
The Global Health & Emerging Pathogens Institute at Icahn School of Medicine at Mount Sinai
The Adolfo García-Sastre Lab at the Mount Sinai School of Medicine

Influenza researchers
Living people
American microbiologists
Icahn School of Medicine at Mount Sinai faculty
University of Salamanca alumni
American virologists
1964 births